Kohel Bolagh (also Romanized as Kohel Bolāgh; also known as Kohel Bolāghī) is a village in Nazarkahrizi Rural District, Nazarkahrizi District, Hashtrud County, East Azerbaijan Province, Iran. At the 2006 census, its population was 162, in 43 families.

References 

Towns and villages in Hashtrud County